Jessica Michibata is a Japanese fashion model.

Personal life
Michibata was born in Fukui Prefecture, Japan, to a Japanese mother and an Argentine father of Spanish and Italian descent.

Michibata was married to British Formula One driver Jenson Button. They married in Hawaii in December 2014. They divorced after one year of marriage.

On March 20, 2023, Michibata was arrested by the police for allegedly possessing MDMA. She denied the charges.

Advertisements
 Michibata is a brand ambassador for TAG Heuer.

References

External links
 
 
 
 

Japanese female models
Japanese people of Argentine descent
Japanese people of Italian descent
Japanese people of Spanish descent
Living people
Models from Fukui Prefecture
Racing drivers' wives and girlfriends
Year of birth missing (living people)